Robert Montgomery or Bob Montgomery may refer to:

Entertainment
 Robert Montgomery (poet) (1807–1855), English poet and minister
 Robert Montgomery (actor) (1904–1981), American actor and director
 Robert Douglass Montgomery (1909–1966), American actor
 Bob Montgomery (songwriter) (1937–2014), American singer, songwriter, and music producer
 Robert Montgomery (artist) (born 1972), Scottish artist
 Robert Bruce Montgomery, a.k.a. Edmund Crispin (1921–1978), crime writer

Politics and law
 Robert Montgomery (colonial administrator) (1809–1887), Irish-born British Colonial official in India
 Robert Montgomery Martin (c. 1801–1868), Colonial Treasurer of Hong Kong from 1844–45
 Robert Morris Montgomery (1849–1920), American jurist
 Robert Mortimer Montgomery (1869–1948), British politician, school administrator, legal writer
 Robert Montgomery (lawyer) (1930–2008), American litigator
 Robert Montgomery (politician), Republican member of the Kansas House of Representatives

Sports
 Robert Montgomery (sport shooter) (1891–?), Canadian sport shooter at the 1920 Summer Olympics
 Bob Montgomery (boxer) (1919–1998), American lightweight boxer
 Bob Montgomery (baseball) (born 1944), American catcher and commentator
 Robert Montgomery (boxer) (born 1983), Canadian super heavyweight boxer who represented Canada at the 2006 Commonwealth Games

Other
 Robert Montgomery (archbishop) (1541–1611), Archbishop of Glasgow, 1581–85
 Robert Montgomery (Medal of Honor) (1838–after 1864), American Naval Captain and Medal of Honor recipient
 Robert Montgomery (British Army officer) (1848–1931), British general
 Robert Hiester Montgomery (1872–1953), American accountant and educator
 Robert Montgomery (physician), American transplant surgeon
 Robert R. Montgomery, American who invented fly swatters in 1900
 Bob Montgomery (psychologist), Australian convicted in 2021 for child sexual abuse

See also
Robert Montgomerie (disambiguation)
Montgomery (name)